Alberto Gheorghe Călin (born 8 July 2005) is a Romanian professional footballer who plays as a forward for CS Universitatea Craiova.

Club career

Universitatea Craiova
While a junior at Flacăra Moreni in 2017, Călin traveled to Spain club Barcelona for a trial. He made his Liga I debut for Universitatea Craiova against Dinamo București on 10 February 2022.

Career statistics

Club

References

External links
 
 Alberto Călin at lpf.ro

2005 births
Living people
People from Moreni
Romanian footballers
Romania youth international footballers
Association football forwards
Liga I players
CS Universitatea Craiova players